FC Gumefens Sorens  are a Swiss football team currently playing in 2. Liga Interregional,
the fourth tier in the Swiss football pyramid Group 2. The club was formed in 1962.
They finished 2011/2012 season in 1st position resulting in promotion .

Staff and board members

 Trainer: Hervé Thimonier
 Women's football team's Trainer: Luc Pythoud
 President: Eric Ropraz
 Secretary : Isabelle Maillard
 Treasurer : Sylviane Meyer

External links
 https://web.archive.org/web/20090722033740/http://www.fcgumefenssorens.ch/cms/index.php?idm=1&page=Accueil   

Association football clubs established in 1962
Gumefens Sorens
1962 establishments in Switzerland